Topolitsa is a village in Aytos Municipality, in Burgas Province, in southeastern Bulgaria. The village of Topolitsa has 979 inhabitants (in 2011). Almost two thirds are  Turks, while a third is Pomak. All inhabitants are Muslim.

References

Villages in Burgas Province